WUD may refer to:
 Woke Up Dead, a web series
 World University of Design, in Haryana, India
 World Usability Day
 Wudinna Airport, in South Australia
 Wudu language, spoken in Togo